Wain-Erap Rural LLG is a local-level government (LLG) of Morobe Province, Papua New Guinea.

Wards
01. Kokosan
02. Saut
03. Finungwa
04. Lowai
05. Rabisap
06. Tinibi
07. Sintogora (Mungkip language speakers)
08. Kisengan One
09. Kisengan Two
10. Gain
11. Sadao
12. Kuepunum
13. Bandong
14. Gusi
15. Gamiki (Nafi language speakers)
16. Pupuf
17. Gumbum
18. Gewak

References

Local-level governments of Morobe Province